Nano, Nano-, NANO or NaNo may refer to:

People
 Nano (singer) (born 1988), Japanese-American J-pop singer
 Nano Omar (born 1986), Swedish singer
 Nano Riantiarno (born 1949), Indonesian director
 Agnese Nano (born 1965), Italian actress
 Fatos Nano (born 1952), former Prime Minister of Albania
 Lourdes Flores Nano (born 1959), Peruvian politician
 Nano Macedo (born 1982), Spanish football winger, full name Fernando Macedo da Silva Rodilla
 Nano Mesa (born 1995), Spanish football forward, full name Alexander Mesa Travieso
 Nano Rivas (born 1980), Spanish football defender, full name Victoriano Rivas Álvaro
 Nano (Egyptian footballer) (born 1985), Egyptian football defender/midfielder, full name Mohamed Mahmoud
 Nano (footballer, born 1982), Spanish football winger, full name Fernando Macedo da Silva Rodilla
 Nano (footballer, born 1984), Spanish football defender, full name Mariano González Maroto

Science and technology
 GNU nano, a text editor for Unix-like systems
 iPod Nano, a digital media player
 nano-, a metric prefix denoting a factor of 10−9
 Nano (cryptocurrency)
 NANO (journal),an international peer-reviewed scientific journal
 Nano, an Arduino model (single-board microcontroller)
 Nano receiver, a type of wireless computer mouse technology
 Nanotechnology, a field of study dealing with nano-scale objects
 Radeon R9 Nano, a graphics card
 Silver Nano, an antibacterial technology
 VIA Nano, a central processing unit (CPU)
 Microsoft Nano Server, an installation option for Windows Server 2016

Transport
Tata Nano, a car
FlyNano Nano, a Finnish ultralight aircraft

Fiction
 Nano Shinonome, a character in the Japanese comedy manga series Nichijou
 Cartoon Network Universe: FusionFall
 The New Adventures of Nanoboy, an animated TV series
 Nano (comics), a member of the Fearsome Five from DC Comics
 Nano Eiai from the manga Kimi no koto ga Dai Dai Dai Dai Daisuki na 100-nin no Kanojo

Other
 Beretta Nano, a micro compact pistol
 Magnetic nano, (often nicknamed 'nano'), a tiny container used in geocaching
 NaNo, National Novel, related to the National Novel Writing Month

See also
 Nanos (disambiguation)